Elgin West was a federal electoral district represented in the House of Commons of Canada from 1867 to 1935. It was located in the province of Ontario. It was created by the British North America Act of 1867 which divided the county of Elgin into two ridings: Elgin East and Elgin West based on a traditional division.

The West Riding of Elgin was redefined in 1882 to consist of the townships of Southwold, Dunwich, Alboro', Orford and Howard, and the village of Ridgetown. In 1903, it was redefined to exclude the townships of  Orford and Howard, and the village of Ridgetown, and include the townships of the city of St. Thomas, and the town of Dutton. In 1914, it was redefined to include the villages of Rodney and West Lorne.

In 1924, it was defined as consisting of the county of Elgin, excluding the townships of Malahide and Bayham, and including the city of St. Thomas.

The electoral district was abolished in 1933 when it was merged into Elgin ridings.

Election results

On Mr. Crother's being appointed Minister of Labour, 10 October 191:

|}

On Mr. Hepburn's resignation, 8 June 1934:

|}

See also 

 List of Canadian federal electoral districts
 Past Canadian electoral districts

References

External links 
Riding history from the Library of Parliament

Former federal electoral districts of Ontario